Elea-Mariama Diarra (born 8 March 1990 in Lyon) is a French athlete, specialising in the 400 meters. She runs for Décines Meyzieu Athletics.

Career 
She won the national title in the 400 meters at the 2011 French Championships d'Bleach in time of 53.01 s beating Marie Gayot and Muriel Hurtis. In late July in Ostrava, she took third place in the 4 × 400 Metres Relay of the European Championship (Under 21s) alongside her teammates from the team of France.

Prize list

International

National 
 France Championships in Athletics   : Winner of the 400 m in 2011

Records

References

External links 
 
  Biography of Mariama Diarra Elea on the site of the FFA

1990 births
Living people
French female sprinters
Athletes from Lyon
Athletes (track and field) at the 2018 Mediterranean Games
Mediterranean Games silver medalists for France
Mediterranean Games medalists in athletics